Gutland can mean:

Gotland, the largest island and a province of Sweden
Gutland (Luxembourg), a region of southern Luxembourg
Gutland (film), a 2017 film